Widari (born in Kutai Kartanegara Regency) is an Indonesian powerlifter. She won three gold medals at the World Championships in Plzeň, Czech Republic.

References

Living people
Year of birth missing (living people)
People from Kutai Kartanegara Regency
Indonesian powerlifters